Mount Binaca is an inactive volcano the Municipality of Upi in Maguindanao province, Philippines.

See also

List of inactive volcanoes in the Philippines

Volcanoes of Mindanao
Inactive volcanoes of the Philippines
Landforms of Maguindanao del Norte